Põhja-Tallinna JK Volta is an Estonian football club based in Tallinn. Founded in 2016, they currently play in the Esiliiga B, the third tier of Estonian football. They also have two reserve teams - Põhja-Tallinna JK Volta II (II Liiga) and Põhja-Tallinna JK Volta III (III Liiga). They started in III liiga 2017, which they won on their first try. The following year the club triumphed in the fourth league and got promoted to Esiliiga B for the first time.

Players

Current squad
 ''As of 7 May 2019.

Club officials

Coaching staff

Stadium

The club's home ground is the 500-seat Sõle jalgpallihall, located in Põhja-Tallinn, Sõle 40. Stadium opened first in 2017.

Statistics

League and Cup

References

External links
Team info at Estonian Football Association

Football clubs in Estonia
Association football clubs established in 2016
2016 establishments in Estonia